Swill may also refer to:
Pig swill
 Swill (album), an album by Ten Foot Pole
 Philip "Swill" Odgers, singer with The Men They Couldn't Hang
 Six o'clock swill
Swill Brook, a number of streams in England